Most of the Game is a 1935 comedy play by the British writer John Van Druten. Much of the play is set in New York where a British writer and his aristocratic wife have fallen out of love with each other, and started new relationships with a teacher's daughter and a Hollywood actor respectively. Complications ensue when the press gets hold of the story.

The play's Broadway run was at the Cort Theatre. The cast included Dorothy Hyson and Robert Douglas.

References

Bibliography
 Gerald Bordman. American Theatre: A Chronicle of Comedy and Drama, 1930-1969. Oxford University Press, 1996.
 Wearing, J.P. The London Stage 1930-1939: A Calendar of Productions, Performers, and Personnel.  Rowman & Littlefield, 2014.

1935 plays
Plays by John Van Druten
West End plays